Geteuma quadriguttata is a species of beetle in the family Cerambycidae. It was described by Charles Coquerel in 1852. It is known from Madagascar.

References

Crossotini
Beetles described in 1852
Taxa named by Charles Coquerel